Chumney is a surname. Notable people with the surname include:

Brian Chumney, American sound editor
Carol Chumney (born 1961), American lawyer and politician 
Desmond Chumney (born 1968), Canadian cricketer

See also
Barrett–Chumney House